Roland Clark (April 2, 1874 – April 13, 1957) was an American painter. His work was part of the painting event in the art competition at the 1932 Summer Olympics.

References

1874 births
1957 deaths
20th-century American painters
American male painters
Olympic competitors in art competitions
People from New Rochelle, New York
20th-century American male artists